Pegwn Mawr is a mountain in Powys, Mid Wales, east of Llanidloes. It is 586 m (1,922 ft) high. It is surrounded by a wind farm. There is a trig point (pictured)

References

Marilyns of Wales
Mountains and hills of Powys